Happy Holidays is a 2014 Magnus Carlsson Christmas album.

Track listing
Chestnuts Roasting on an Open Fire (The Christmas Song)
The Man With The Bag
Snow Song
This Christmas Night
Mary, Did You Know?
Christmas Auld Lang Syne
Let There Be Light
O Holy Night (Cantique de Noël)
Home
White Christmas
Happy Holidays Medley
O Helga Natt (Cantique de Noël, bonus)

Charts

References

Magnus Carlsson albums
2014 Christmas albums
Christmas albums by Swedish artists
Pop Christmas albums